Time Gentlemen Please is a studio album released in 2009 by Martin Gordon on Radiant Future Records.

Track listing
 "Elephantasy"
 "Houston We Gotta Drinking Problem"
 "On and On"
 "21st Century Blues"
 "Come Out Come Out Whoever You Are"
 "I Feel Fine"
 "If Boys Could Talk and Girls Could Think"
 "Talulah Does the Hula From Hawaii"
 "Shoot the Women First"
 "Panama"
 "Incognito Ergo Sum"
 "I Have a Chav"
 "Interesting Times"
 "Passionate About Your Elevator"
 "I'm Budgie (Don't Fly Me)"
 "You Can't See Me"

Personnel
 Martin Gordon/bass, keyboards, production
 Pelle Almgren/vocals
 Ralf Leeman/guitar, ukulele
 Enrico Antico/guitar
 Steve Budney/drums

References

Album page at Martin Gordon site

Martin Gordon albums
2009 albums
Radiant Future albums
Albums produced by Martin Gordon